Apleurus saginatus is a species of cylindrical weevil in the beetle family Curculionidae. It is found in North America.

References

Further reading

 
 

Lixinae
Articles created by Qbugbot
Beetles described in 1891